Horizon Hobby, LLC. is an American international hobby product distributor, headquartered in Champaign, Illinois, United States. It currently manufactures various hobby-grade radio-controlled (RC) models, as well as Athearn model trains and die-cast models, which it sells direct to consumers as well as to hobby retailers.

History
In October 1985, Horizon Hobby was founded by Rick Stephens, an American entrepreneur.

On December 9, 2013, Horizon announced that the company was being bought by a group of investors led by Horizon's CEO, Joe Ambrose. The group includes Minneapolis-based Mill City Capital L.P. and Champaign-based Armory Capital LLC founded by Jacob Ambrose.

Horizon Hobby entered an agreement to purchase its competitor, Hobbico, in April 2018.

Before being purchased by Horizon Hobby, the Losi remote-controlled car division had been a separate company founded by Gil Losi with the release of the JRX2 in 1988.

November 2021 - Horizon Hobby Announced the acquisition of Realflight RC Simulator from Knife Edge Software.

Losi - RC Cars
Team Losi Racing, often referred to as TLR, has been designing radio-controlled cars and accessories for 40 years primarily as high end competition products. The brand dates back to the early 1980s with roots in Southern California. In 2000, Losi become part of the Horizon Hobby family. The company was founded by Gil Losi Snr and Gil Losi Jr. who won the first IFMAR 1:10 Electric Off-Road World Championships held in 1985. The car he raced was a highly modified Yokomo - YZ-834B.

History of Losi 

Team Losi's first vehicle, the JRX2, was a 1/10 Scale 2wd Off-Road racing buggy. Released to the public in 1988, the JRx-2 featured 5-link rear suspension arms, carbon-graphite chassis, and all-natural rubber racing tires. The JRx-T was the first "purpose built" electric stadium trucks that did not require racers to modify an existing buggy. The JRx-Pro SE was the first competition buggy to come standard with a molded composite chassis in an era where stamped aluminum and graphite plates were the standard. The Street Weapon was not only Team Losi's first on-road Sedan, but also the first IFMAR IWC Touring Car Championship Chassis. Team Losi early success in the 1/10-scale offroad electric category winning multiple world championship.

In the late 1990s, Ernie Provetti's company (Trinity) bought a 50% stake in Losi. Most if not all Losi Factory Drivers were using Trinity motors or batteries at the time. However, the partnership lasted only a few months before the two companies split. Gil Losi Sr. of Team Losi sold the Team Losi brand to Horizon Hobby in 2001. Losi continues to operate in Southern California alongside Horizon Hobby.

Other, unusual items produced or endorsed by Losi include the PlayStation video game Team Losi RC Racing and a Team Losi line of high-performance yo-yos designed by Steve Brown. These were the 'Cherry Bomb', 'Da Bomb' and the 'Grim Sleeper', both using Losi race-specification ball bearings.

In March 2007, Gil Losi, Jr., co-founder of Losi, left Losi for Kyosho America.

World Championship Titles

Team Losi Racing Line-Up
This includes current ONLY TLR vehicles.

Electric Buggies, Trucks, and Truggies
1/8 8IGHT-XE Elite 4WD
1/8 8IGHT-XT/XET Truggy (Also comes w/ nitro configuration)
1/10 22X-4 Buggy
1/10 22 5.0 DC Elite
1/10 22 5.0 DC Race Roller
1/10 22 5.0 AC Astro/Carpet
1/10 22T 4.0 2WD
1/10 22SCT 3.0 2WD
1/10 TEN-SCTE 3.0
Nitro Buggies and Truggies
1/8 8IGHT-X Elite
1/8 8IGHT-X
1/8 8IGHT-XT/XTE Truggy (Also comes w/ electric configuration)

Notes

References

External links 
 Official web site
 Official Air Meet Location

Model manufacturers of the United States
Companies based in Champaign County, Illinois
Champaign, Illinois